William Armstrong Percy III (December 10, 1933 – October 30, 2022) was an American professor, historian, encyclopedist, and gay activist. He taught from 1968 at the University of Massachusetts Boston, and started publishing in gay studies in 1985.

Early life and education
Bill was born to Anne Minor Dent and William Armstrong Percy, II, of the Mississippi Percy family. His mother was raised by her widowed uncle, the distinguished Memphis lawyer Dent Minor. He was a descendant of 17th-century Dent settlers in Maryland and the Minors in Virginia. Dent's great-uncle John B. Minor taught law at the University of Virginia from 1845 to 1895 and served for decades there as dean of the Law School.

After graduating as valedictorian of Middlesex School (in Concord, Massachusetts) in 1951, Percy went to Princeton University, where he entered the Special Program in the Humanities.  There, he struggled with the rejection and persecution of gays during the McCarthy years. At a time when conscription was still in effect, he volunteered for the U.S. Army. In his military stint, Percy studied Norwegian at the Army Language School Monterey, Ca. He worked as a French interpreter on loan to the Central Intelligence Agency on the island of Saipan.

Career
Percy taught at the University of New Orleans, Louisiana State University, and the University of Missouri at St. Louis for two years each. In 1968 he moved to the University of Massachusetts at Boston. After gaining tenure and promotion to full professor there, in 1975 Percy "came out" to colleagues.  He joined the fight for equal rights for gays in 1982 after meeting gay activist Charley Shively.

Three years later, Percy began publishing articles on homosexuality, including in the very radical Gay Community News, based in the South End of Boston. Soon after, Percy served as the other associate editor with Warren Johansson of the Encyclopedia of Homosexuality (1990), which won six prizes. It has recently been reprinted by Rutledge, costing $500 for the two volumes.

Paul Cartledge, of the University of Cambridge, described Percy's Pederasty and Pedagogy in Archaic Greece (1996) as the first work to try to go beyond Kenneth Dover's "groundbreaking" Greek Homosexuality. Dover's work, influenced by pseudo-Freudianism, was very homophobic. Cartledge noted there were finer works in German that were translated into English before Dover wrote.

At the time Percy published Outing: Shattering the Conspiracy of Silence (1994), co-authored with Warren Johansson, he announced that he was offering a bounty of $10,000 for the person who successfully "outed" a living American cardinal, a sitting justice of the U.S. Supreme Court, or a four-star officer on active duty in the U.S. military.  In light of the 2003 Supreme Court decision that decriminalized sodomy (Lawrence v. Texas), he amended his bounty offer to exclude a Supreme Court justice, but increased the bounty to $20,000 for a cardinal or a four-star officer. After the military changed its policy on service by admitted homosexuals, he dropped outing a military officer. He increased the offer to $30,000 for a living American cardinal. Percy withdrew his bounty because he believed the Church had been weakened by its sexual and abuse scandals. He wanted to support it as, under Pope Francis, it focused more on the poor.

Frustrated with academic and general political correctness and censorship, Percy established a website, as he explained: "to publicize those who don’t demonize 'the Eight P’s': promiscuity, public sex, pederasty, pornography, prostitution, paraphernalia, poètes maudits, and “planters” (dead males who made Western Civilization and most others)".

Percy frequently contributes to The Gay and Lesbian Review Worldwide, published and edited by Richard Schneider. Like the earlier Gay Community News, it is published in the South End of Boston. This is a gay neighborhood of historic structures where Percy has rehabbed eight buildings.

Percy published The Age of Marriage in Ancient Rome (2003), suggesting that Roman males married at younger ages than concluded by other historians, and to women younger than had been suggested by others. The book got little attention. After about a year, Percy telephoned Walter Scheidel, a leading expert in the field at Stanford University, to recommend he read it because Scheidel's conclusions were erroneous. A great deal of discussion ensued thereafter.

Since then, Percy has posted on his own website a great many more refutations of Scheidel's work. The triumvirate of Saller, Shaw, and Scheidel persist in their position that ancient Roman males married around age 28 instead of 18, and to females of 18 instead of 14. The earlier average dates were found by Percy among his personal trove of ancient Roman wedding licenses and divorce papyri. Of all ancient people studied by Percy, only Greek males waited until about 30 to marry. In Sparta, they normally married females of 18, but in other free cities, they married females aged from 14-16, soon after the passage to puberty.

William Armstrong Percy III died on 30 October 2022 at the age of 88.

Notes

Works by Percy 
 The Age of Recovery: The Fifteenth Century (Vol. X, The Development of Western Civilization series), with Jerah Johnson.  New York: Cornell University Press, 1970.
 Encyclopedia of Homosexuality,  Ed. Wayne R. Dynes.  2 vols.  New York:  Garland, 1990.
 Outing:  Shattering the Conspiracy of Silence, with Warren Johansson. New York: Haworth Press, 1994.
Pederasty and Pedagogy in Archaic Greece. Champaigne/Urbana:  University of Illinois Press, 1996. 
 The Age of Marriage in Ancient Rome, with Arnold Lelis and Beert Verstraete.  Lewiston, New York: The Edwin Mellen Press, 2003.

External links
 Biography of William Armstrong Percy, personal website
"William A. Percy", University of Massachusetts-Boston, Faculty webpage

21st-century American historians
21st-century American male writers
American LGBT rights activists
American LGBT writers
LGBT people from Tennessee
1933 births
Living people
Cornell University alumni
Historians of LGBT topics
Defense Language Institute alumni
Middlesex School alumni
People from Memphis, Tennessee
American male non-fiction writers